Viorel Dinu Moldovan (born 8 July 1972) is a Romanian football manager and former player. A striker, he was an important player for the Romania national team in the 1990s.

Club career
Moldovan was born in Bistrița.

At club level, Moldovan played for Gloria Bistrița (1990–93), Dinamo București (1993–95), Neuchâtel Xamax (1995–96), Grasshoppers (1996–97), Coventry City (1998), Fenerbahçe (1998–2000), Nantes (2000–04), Servette (2004), FCU Politehnica Timișoara (2005), and Rapid București (2006–2007).

The most successful years of his career were playing for Neuchâtel Xamax and Grasshoppers between 1996 and 1998 in Switzerland (he was the Swiss Super League top scorer in 1996 and 1997), for Fenerbahçe between 1998 and 2000 and for Nantes between 2000 and 2004. He was a key player when Nantes won the French Ligue 1 in 2001. During his brief spell in England with Coventry City he scored twice,  once in the FA Cup, scoring the winner against local rivals Aston Villa, and once in the league against Crystal Palace.

International career
Moldovan was capped 70 times for Romania, scoring 25 goals. He represented his country at Euro 96, the 1998 FIFA World Cup, during which he scored goals against England and Tunisia in the first round, and Euro 2000.

Coaching career
Moldovan worked as the sporting director of FC Unirea Valahorum Urziceni and was the coach of FC Vaslui. On 26 May 2009, the coach quit FC Vaslui after just seven months for failing to guide the team to European qualification. The squad was then managed by coaching assistant Cristian Dulca on a temporary basis until a new coach was hired. On 28 July 2009, the Italian coach Nicolò Napoli quit FC Brașov and was replaced by Moldovan, who signed a two-year deal.

Career statistics

Club

International

Scores and results list Romania's goal tally first, score column indicates score after each Moldovan goal.

Honours
Sources:

Player
Gloria Bistrița
Divizia B: 1989–90

Grasshoppers
Swiss League: 1997–98

Nantes
Ligue 1: 2000–01
Trophée des champions: 2001

Rapid București
Romanian Cup: 2005–06, 2006–07

Individual
Swiss League top scorer: 1995–96, 1996–97
Swiss Foreign Footballer of the Year: 1995–96, 1996–97

Manager
Rapid București
Liga II: Runner-up 2013–14 (Promotion to Liga I)

Chindia Târgoviște
Liga II: 2018–19

References

1972 births
Living people
Sportspeople from Bistrița
Romanian footballers
Association football forwards
ACF Gloria Bistrița players
FC Dinamo București players
Neuchâtel Xamax FCS players
Grasshopper Club Zürich players
Coventry City F.C. players
Fenerbahçe S.K. footballers
FC Nantes players
Al Wahda FC players
Servette FC players
FC Politehnica Timișoara players
FC Rapid București players
Liga I players
Swiss Super League players
Premier League players
Süper Lig players
Ligue 1 players
UAE Pro League players
Expatriate footballers in Switzerland
Expatriate footballers in England
Expatriate footballers in Turkey
Expatriate footballers in France
Expatriate footballers in the United Arab Emirates
Romanian expatriate footballers
Romanian expatriate sportspeople in Switzerland
Romanian expatriate sportspeople in England
Romanian expatriate sportspeople in Turkey
Romanian expatriate sportspeople in France
Romanian expatriate sportspeople in the United Arab Emirates
Romania international footballers
1994 FIFA World Cup players
1998 FIFA World Cup players
UEFA Euro 1996 players
UEFA Euro 2000 players
Romanian football managers
Romanian expatriate football managers
Ligue 2 managers
FC Vaslui managers
FC Brașov (1936) managers
FC Sportul Studențesc București managers
FC Rapid București managers
AJ Auxerre managers
AFC Chindia Târgoviște managers
FC Petrolul Ploiești managers
Expatriate football managers in France